The men's 50 kilometre cross-country skiing competition at the 1984 Winter Olympics in Sarajevo, Yugoslavia, was held on Sunday 19 February at Veliko Polje, Igman. It was the last event of the men's cross-country skiing programme at these games and the fourteenth appearance of the 50 kilometre race as it had appeared in every Winter games. Thomas Wassberg of Sweden was the 1982 World champion and Nikolay Zimyatov of the Soviet Union was the defending champion from the 1980 Olympics in Lake Placid, United States.

Each skier started at half a minute intervals, skiing the entire 50 kilometre course. Of the 54 athletes who started the race, 4 did not finish. Thomas Wassberg of the Sweden took his second Gold medal of the games after being part of Sweden's winning Men's 4 x 10km relay team, and his third all-time Gold medal. His fellow countryman Gunde Svan took silver and therefore won a medal in every cross-country event for men.

Results
Sources:

References

External links
 Final results (International Ski Federation)

Men's cross-country skiing at the 1984 Winter Olympics
Men's 50 kilometre cross-country skiing at the Winter Olympics